Dhaalu may refer to:

Dhaalu Atoll, an administrative division of the Maldives.
Dhaalu, the 12th consonant of the Thaana abugaida used in Dhivehi.